William Scott Merritt (April 10, 1886 – death date unknown) was an American Negro league pitcher in the 1900s.

A native of Easton, Pennsylvania, Merritt made his Negro leagues debut in 1905 for the Brooklyn Royal Giants. He played three seasons with Brooklyn through 1907.

References

External links
 and Seamheads

1886 births
Year of death missing
Place of death missing
Brooklyn Royal Giants players
Baseball pitchers
Baseball players from Pennsylvania
Sportspeople from Easton, Pennsylvania